Methemalbumin (MHA) is an albumin complex consisting of albumin and heme.

This complex gives brown color to plasma and occurs in hemolytic and hemorrhagic disorders.

Its presence in plasma is used to differentiate between hemorrhagic and edematous pancreatitis.

The Schumm test is used to differentiate intravascular haemolysis from extravascular haemolysis, as in haemolytic anaemias. A positive result is indicative of intravascular haemolysis.

References

Proteins